Part-time Work Directive 97/81/EC is one of three EU Directives that regulate atypical work. Alongside the Fixed-term Work Directive and the Agency Work Directive, its aim is to ensure that people who have not contracted for permanent jobs are nevertheless guaranteed a minimum level of equal treatment compared to full-time permanent staff.

Content
Article 1 of the Directive states its purpose to enforce the framework agreement between the ETUC, the UNICE and the CEEP. This gives rise to the various provisions on fixed-term worker rights in the Directive.

clause 2(2) says member states can exclude for objective reasons some categories of casual workers, after consulting social partners.
clause 3(2) ‘The term ‘comparable full-time worker’ means a full-time worker in the same establishment having the same type of employment contract or relationship, who is engaged in the same or a similar work/occupation, due regard being given to other considerations which may include seniority and qualification/skills. Where there is no comparable full-time worker in the same establishment, the comparison shall be made by reference to the applicable collective agreement or, where there is no applicable collective agreement, in accordance with national law, collective agreements or practice.’
clause 4(1) ‘In respect of employment conditions, part-time workers shall not be treated in a less favourable manner than comparable full-time workers solely because they work part time unless different treatment is justified on objective grounds.’ (4) through collective agreements social partners can apply conditions for access based on length of service, time worked or earnings.
clause 5(1) member states should identify and review obstacles to part-time work (2) a worker's refusal to go from full to part-time, or the other way, should not be a reason for dismissal (3) employers should give consideration to job transfer requests in and out of part-time work, provide information to worker representatives about vacancies in and out of part-time work, facilitate access to it and provide vocational training to part-time workers.
clause 6(1) the law of a member state can be more favourable to part-time workers.

Recital 16 also clarifies that undefined terms should be defined ‘in accordance with national law and practice’.

Implementation

EU case law
R (Seymour-Smith and Perez) v Secretary of State for Employment [1999] 2 CMLR 273 [1999] IRLR 253(C-167/97) and [2000] IRLR 263
Wippel v Peek & Cloppenburg GmbH & Co KG [2005] IRLR 211 (C-313/02)

United Kingdom
The Part-time Workers (Prevention of Less Favourable Treatment) Regulations 2000 implemented the Directive in UK law, without any appearance of going beyond the minimum. In the leading case, Matthews v Kent & Medway Towns Fire Authority the House of Lords found that a group of part-time and full-time firefighters were comparable, even though the part-time fire fighters did not do the administrative work of the full-time staff.

McMenemy v Capita Business Ltd [2007] IRLR 400
Sharma v Manchester City Council [2008] IRLR 336

See also
ILO Part-Time Work Convention 1994 (c 175) 
ILO Part-Time Work Recommendation 1994 (no 182)

Notes

References
A Manning and B Petrongolo, ‘The Part-Time Pay Penalty for Women in Britain’ (2008) 118 The Economic Journal F28
M Jeffrey, ‘Not Really Going to Work?’ (1998) 27 ILJ 193
Aileen McColgan, ‘Missing The Point?’ (2000) 29 ILJ 260, 267

United Kingdom labour law
European Union labour law
1997 in the European Union
1997 in labor relations
1997 in law